Gorchakova is a surname. Notable people with the surname include:

Galina Gorchakova (born 1962), Russian opera singer
Larisa Gorchakova (born 1964), Russian swimmer
Yelena Gorchakova (1933–2002), Soviet athlete

See also
Gorchakov
Ulitsa Gorchakova, Moscow Metro station